The 1924–25 Magyar Kupa (English: Hungarian Cup) was the 8th season of Hungary's annual knock-out cup football competition.

Final

See also
 1924–25 Nemzeti Bajnokság I

References

External links
 Official site 
 soccerway.com

1924–25 in Hungarian football
1924–25 domestic association football cups
1924-25